South River State Forest is located in Conway, Massachusetts.  The forest is managed by the Department of Conservation and Recreation (DCR).

Description
The South River State Forest consists of two separate sections - one adjacent to Bardwell's Ferry Bridge and the other where the old Conway Electric Street Railway met the New York, New Haven and Hartford Railroad line.  Its name comes from the river that runs through it, part of the Deerfield River watershed.

The Mahican-Mohawk Trail runs through the park, often following the location of the abandoned New York, New Haven and Hartford Railroad.

Recreational opportunities

Fishing
Hiking
Hunting (restricted)
Picnicking
Skiing (Cross-Country)
Swimming
Walking Trails

See also
List of Massachusetts state forests
List of Massachusetts State Parks

External links
South River State Forest - Conway Station - FranklinSites.com

Massachusetts state forests
Massachusetts natural resources
Parks in Franklin County, Massachusetts